Ludisia (Lus.) is a genus of orchids that was thought to contain just one species, Ludisia discolor, commonly referred to as jewel orchid.  A second species,  Ludisia ravanii, from the Philippines, was described in 2013. Ludisia discolor  is native to Southern China, Northeast India, Thailand, Vietnam, the Philippines, Malaysia, Indonesia and Myanmar, and often cultivated.

Description 
They are terrestrial orchids that in their natural setting would be found growing on the forest floor. They are known for their foliage, which is often velvety deep maroon with red veins that run parallel to the centre of the leaf.  

Flowers are white with twisting yellow columns. Individual flowers are small but grow in clusters on upright stalks. Flowers in cultivation last a month or more.

Cultivation 
They need high humidity and warm temperatures with low to medium light, and they tolerate extremely low light levels.

Cultivars 
Ludisia discolor has two notable cultivars:
 L. discolor 'Alba', an albino variant, and
 L. discolor 'Nigrescens', a mutation often referred to as "black velvet".

Hybrids 
Hybrids of Ludisia with other orchid genera are placed in the following nothogenera:
 Dossisia (Dsi.) = Ludisia × Dossinia 
 Goodisia (Gda.) = Ludisia × Goodyera
 Ludochilus (Lud.) = Ludisia × Anoectochilus
 Macodisia (Mcd.) = Ludisia × Macodes
Note that these hybrids are with other genera in the subtribe Goodyerinae, all commonly referred to as jewel orchids.

(The given references are to registered primary hybrids within each given nothogenus.)

References

External links 

Goodyerinae
Monotypic Orchidoideae genera
Cranichideae genera
Orchids of Myanmar
Orchids of Indonesia
Orchids of Malaysia
Orchids of China
Orchids of Thailand
Orchids of the Philippines